Pine Canyon is Burning, also known as Quail Lake, is a 1977 American drama film made for television, directed by Christian I. Nyby II and written by Robert A. Cinader. The film, about a widowed firefighter and two children in Pine Canyon, stars Kent McCord, Megan McCord, Shane Sinutko and Diana Muldaur. The 78 minute movie in a 90-minute slot aired on NBC on May 18, 1977.

Plot

Cast
Kent McCord as Capt. William Stone, patrol 99
Megan McCord as Margaret Stone
Shane Sinutko as Michael Stone
Diana Muldaur as Sandra
Andrew Duggan as Capt. Ed Wilson
Richard Bakalyan as Charlie Edison
Brit Lind as Anne Walker
Curtis Credel as Whitey Olson
Sandy McPeak as Pete Madison
Larry Delaney as Captain #78
Joan Roberts as Woman

References

External links
 

1977 television films
1977 films
1977 drama films
Films about firefighting
NBC television specials
Films scored by Lee Holdridge
American drama television films
Films directed by Christian I. Nyby II
1970s American films